Schweik's New Adventures is a 1943 British comedy film directed by Karel Lamač and starring Lloyd Pearson, Maggie Rennie, Richard Attenborough and Julien Mitchell. It is also known by the alternative title It Started at Midnight. It was adapted from a novel by Jaroslav Hašek. The music was by Clifton Parker, his first film score.

Partial cast
 Lloyd Pearson - Josef Schweik
 Maggie Rennie - Madame Lidia Karová
 Richard Attenborough - Railway worker
 Julien Mitchell - Gestapo Chief
 George Carney - Gendarme
 Muriel George - Mrs. Millerová
 Anthony Holles - Opera manager
 Eliot Makeham - Professor Jan Borski
 Jan Masaryk - Narrator

References

External links

1943 films
1943 comedy films
Films based on works by Jaroslav Hašek
Films directed by Karel Lamač
Films scored by Clifton Parker
British comedy films
British black-and-white films
The Good Soldier Švejk
1940s English-language films
1940s British films